Adak, formerly Adak Station, is a city located on Adak Island, in the Aleutians West Census Area, Alaska, United States. At the 2020 census, the population was 171, down from 326 in 2010. It is the westernmost municipality in the United States and the southernmost city in Alaska. (See Extreme points of the United States.) The city is the former location of the Adak Navy Base and Adak Naval Operating Base, NAVFAC Adak.

Geography
Adak is located on Kuluk Bay, on Adak Island, in the Andreanof Islands group of the Aleutian Islands Recording District, and in the 3rd Judicial District. Flight time to Anchorage is 3 hours or longer, depending on weather. Adak is the southernmost community in Alaska and on the same latitude as Haida Gwaii in Canada, and Brussels, Belgium. It is less than three degrees of latitude north of the 49th parallel, which forms the western part of the land border between the Contiguous United States and Canada.

Climate
Adak has a subpolar oceanic climate (Cfc), characterized by persistently overcast skies, moderated temperatures, high winds, significant precipitation and frequent cyclonic storms. During the summer, extensive fog forms over the Bering Sea and North Pacific. Average annual precipitation is  annually, concentrated markedly in fall and winter. December is the wettest single month on average, while June and July are markedly the driest months, with thunderstorms virtually unknown here. With 263 rainy days per year, Adak has the second highest number of any inhabited locality in the United States after Hilo, Hawaii.

History and culture

19th century 

The Aleutian Islands were historically occupied by the Unanga, more commonly known now as the Aleuts. The once heavily populated island was eventually abandoned in the early 19th century as the Aleutian Island hunters followed the Russian fur trade eastward, and famine set in on the Andreanof Island group. However, they continued to hunt and fish actively around the island over the years, until World War II broke out.

Military involvement and the naval station 

Adak Army installations allowed U.S. and Canadian forces to mount a successful offensive against the Japanese-held islands of Kiska and Attu. After the war, Adak was developed as a naval air station, playing an important role during the Cold War as a submarine surveillance center. Large earthquakes rocked the island in 1957, 1964 and 1977.

At its peak, the station housed over 6,000 naval and Coast Guard personnel and their families. In 1994, the base was downsized, and both family housing and schools were closed. The station officially closed on March 31, 1997, as a result of 1995 Base Realignment and Closure Commission (BRAC). The Aleut Corporation purchased Adak's facilities under a land transfer agreement with the Department of the Interior and the U.S. Navy/Department of Defense. This agreement was finalized in March, 2004. About 30 families with children relocated to Adak in September 1998, most of them Aleut Corp. shareholders, and the former high school was reopened at that time as a K–12 institution. The community incorporated as a second-class city in April, 2001. Substantially all of the infrastructure and facilities on Adak are owned by Aleut Corporation, which is currently developing Adak as a commercial center via their subsidiary companies. For example, properties in active use are leased by Adak Commercial Properties, LLC.

Since World War II, the U.S. Navy and Coast Guard developed facilities and recreation opportunities at Adak. At its peak, Adak had a college, a McDonald's restaurant, a Baskin-Robbins ice cream stand, movie theater, roller skating rink, swimming pool, ski lodge, bowling alleys, skeet range, auto hobby shop, photo lab, and racquetball & tennis courts. A new $18-million hospital was built in 1990, just seven years prior to the closure of the station. By March 2003, six years after the closure of the station, most of these facilities had closed.

As of March 2021, the U.S. Navy is considering reopening the air base at Adak.

Demographics

Adak first appeared on the 2000 U.S. Census as a census-designated place (CDP), although it previously was the Adak Naval Station from 1970 to 1990. In 2001, it formally incorporated as a city. As of the 2010 census, Adak was the only city in Alaska to have a majority Asian population (171 of 326 residents). Akutan and Kodiak have Asian pluralities.

As of the census of 2000, there were 316 people, 159 households, and 61 families residing in the city. The population density was 2.6 people per square mile (1.0/km). There were 884 housing units at an average density of 7.2 per square mile (2.8/km2).  The racial makeup of the city was 49.68% White, 1.27% Black or African American, 35.13% Native American, 9.81% Asian, 1.90% Pacific Islander, and 2.22% from two or more races.  Of the population, 5.06% were Hispanic or Latino of any race.

Of the 159 households, 18.2% had children under the age of 18 living with them, 28.9% were married couples living together, 2.5% had a female householder with no husband present, and 61.6% were non-families. Of all households, 46.5% were made up of individuals, and none had someone living alone who was 65 years of age or older. The average household size was 1.99 and the average family size was 2.90.

In the city, the population was spread out, with 18.7% under the age of 18, 9.5% from 18 to 24, 44.3% from 25 to 44, 26.3% from 45 to 64, and 1.3% who were 65 years of age or older. The median age was 35 years. For every 100 females, there were 184.7 males. For every 100 females age 18 and over, there were 188.8 males.

The median income for a household in the city was $52,727, and the median income for a family was $53,889. Males had a median income of $46,429 versus $35,000 for females. The per capita income for the city was $31,747. About 3.3% of families and 4.7% of the population were below the poverty line, none of whom were under the age of eighteen or over the age of sixty-five.

Utilities, education, and health care

Water
Water is derived from Lake Bonnie Rose, Lake De Marie, and Nurses Creek, stored in seven water tanks throughout the community, and piped to facilities and housing units. The wastewater treatment system discharges through a marine outfall line to Kuluk Bay. Adak's water system is reported to have lead in it.

Waste
Waste was previously removed of by a permitted landfill site; This site was operated on Adak Island under Alaska Department of Environmental Conservation (Alaska DEC) solid waste regulations. The landfill operated from the early 1950s until 1972 and from 1975 until 2002. The site was used to dispose of sanitary trash, metal debris, batteries, solvents, waste paints, and construction rubble. From 1975 on, the landfill only accepted sanitary trash.

The landfill was closed in 1997 by placing a low permeability soil cover over the landfill, implementing access restrictions, installing surface erosion controls, and placing a vegetative cover. In March 2002, the State of Alaska approved resumption of operations at Roberts Landfill through 2002 to dispose of inert demolition waste monofill and one cell for disposal of approximately 10 cubic yards of asbestos-containing material. Alaska DEC approved closure of the landfill in 2002.

Identified contaminants
Metals and volatile organic compounds (VOCs) in groundwater and surface water.

Current actions
The Navy inspects institutional controls (ICs) annually. The Navy conducts groundwater monitoring at four wells and surface water monitoring at five locations annually.

Electricity
Electricity is provided by TDX which has invested over one million dollars in improving generating and distribution systems. The price of electricity has been reported to have been reduced due to a greater reliance on wind power.

Schools
There is one school located in the community: Adak School, operated by the Aleutian Region School District. In 2014 the Adak School had 25 students. It was previously served by the Adak Region School District, which closed in June 1996.

Internet access
Internet, though available, is expensive, with caps on data.  Average use is extremely expensive, and a monopoly exists because personal satellite internet is not available due to the satellite locations. Solar activity blocks communications during equinox seasons for several days of both spring and fall seasons. Due to its remoteness the internet connection is very poor, applications that require high bandwidth will not work as intended, and can only be picked up in various "hot spots" within the town.

There are no radio stations within 200 miles (320 km) of Adak; radio can be received in Adak only through satellite or shortwave receivers.

Health care
There is no hospital; however there is Adak Community Health Center, managed by Eastern Aleutian Tribes, Inc. (EAT).

The health center provides Family Medicine, Chronic Care and urgent care services, and is staffed by a physician-assistant or, at times, by a community health practitioner. There is no doctor, no blood supply, and limited medications to stabilize a patient awaiting a medical evacuation, weather permitting. Behavioral Health is also provided via tele-video and quarterly site visits.  EAT sends a dentist to Adak one week per year to provide limited dental services; otherwise, dental services must be referred outside of Adak. Tele-Radiology (X-ray) and Tele-Medicine are also present.  Limited lab, pharmacy, and public health services are also available. The pharmacy medications are limited to acute medications. Filling of prescriptions from outside facilities usually cannot be accommodated. All visitors should bring plenty of their own medications as the health center stocks a very limited supply of chronic medications. Auxiliary emergency health care is provided by Adak Volunteer Fire Department.

Economy

A land exchange between Aleut Corp., the U.S. Navy, and the Department of the Interior transferred most of the former naval facilities to the Aleut Corp. in March 2004. A portion of the island remains within the Alaska Maritime National Wildlife Refuge, managed by the United States Fish and Wildlife Service. The U.S. Navy retains part of the north end of Adak Island (Parcel 4) and does annual sweeps of the Andrew Lake Seawall for unexploded ordnance. Their website lists the Institutional Controls in place for all of Adak as part of the land exchange or Interim Conveyance. The Navy provides the trail maps as part of the ordnance awareness information required to be shown to all Adak residents and visitors. Adak currently provides a fueling port and crew transfer facility for a combination of Seattle and Alaskan based fishing fleet — an airport, docks, housing facilities, restaurant, grocery, and ship supply store are available.

Golden Harvest Alaska Seafood processes Pacific cod, pollock, mackerel, halibut, snow and king crabs at a 144,000-square-foot seafood processing facility on the island. Four local residents hold commercial fishing permits, primarily for groundfish; however, commercial fishing vessels based out of Seattle and other parts of Alaska provide most of the work for the seafood plant by regularly offloading their catch at the facility's large dock. The local airport allows the company to send orders via air cargo from Adak to markets around the world, including entire planes full of live king crab to China.

Facilities
Other facilities in Adak include three deep water docks and fueling facilities. The city has requested funds to greatly expand the Sweeper Cove small boat harbor, including new breakwaters, a  dock and new moorage floats .

The Aleut are also seeking to develop their water system, which has been well-maintained and -designed for a larger Naval population, as an export industry.

Airport

Because of its naval aviation past, Adak has an unusually large and sophisticated airport for the Aleutian Islands. The airport is currently operated by the State of Alaska Department of Transportation. Alaska Airlines operates twice-weekly Boeing 737 passenger jet service from Anchorage via Cold Bay. At present, flights operate each Wednesday and Saturday, weather permitting. Occasionally, extra seasonal flights are operated to meet the demand of the fishing season.

Tourism

Land use permits are required for all non-residents visiting Aleut Corporation land.

There are multiple different locations to stay in the city; the former naval base housing can be rented by various companies for long and short stays. Unfortunately cabins that were once maintained by Alaska Maritime National Wildlife Refuge have fallen into disrepair and are unsafe to occupy. Camping is legal without a permit on the Alaska Maritime National Wildlife Refuge land but due to the harsh climate it is not recommended to do so. The wind on Adak is highly variable and often unpredictable (the record speed is unknown because the wind ripped the anemometer off of the tower).

Birdwatchers often travel to Adak and nearby Attu Island, as many vagrant birds from Asia and elsewhere can be spotted there. Bald Eagles exist there in high numbers.

Developed trails are limited and most are not maintained. It is possible to hike on the tundra, but visitors are advised both to prepare for frequent weather changes and to never hike alone.

Nightlife and dining opportunities are few on Adak. The Adak General Store is open sporadically during the week. Two restaurants operate in Adak: the Bay 5 (now permanently closed - was housed in the same annex building with the liquor store) and Blue Bird Cafe (now permanently closed).

Hunting and fishing continue in Adak, especially caribou. There is no bag limit for cows, but in 2007, the Board of Game passed new regulations for bulls. Hunting access to the south end of the island involves two licensed local boat charter services: either Aleutian Adventure Tours or Homeward Bound Charters. Anglers can access halibut in the Kagalaska Straits.

Hunters must possess an Alaska state hunting license and a harvest ticket for each animal taken; non-residents of Alaska must also possess the appropriate big game tag. Anglers require a sport fishing license. All areas of the island with roads are owned by the Aleut Corporation, and a special permit is required for all non-residents accessing this private property. No ATVs are permitted within the wildlife refuge and the Aleut Corporation only allows ATVs on the roads and trails, not on the tundra. Under Alaska state law, wastage is illegal.

Notable people 
 David Vann (born 1966), author
 USN Captain David M. Brown (Astronaut), Space Shuttle Columbia 2003, STS-107

Notes

References

External links
 City website
 Photographs of Adak from 1944
 Adak Memoirs 

 
Cities in Alaska
Cities in Aleutians West Census Area, Alaska
Cities in Unorganized Borough, Alaska
Populated coastal places in Alaska on the Pacific Ocean
Road-inaccessible communities of Alaska
Populated places established in 2001